Denislav Aleksandrov (Bulgarian: Денислав Александров; born 19 July 1997) is a Bulgarian footballer who plays as a winger for Lokomotiv Plovdiv.

Career

Ludogorets Razgrad
Aleksandrov joined the youth system of Ludogorets Razgrad, (Bulgarian: Λудогорец Разград). In 2014, he played for Ludogorets U19 in the UEFA Youth League, being a titular in all of the 6 matches.

In 2014 Aleksandrov made his debut for the first team in the Bulgarian Cup against Botev Vratsa. He also became champion with Ludogorets in the U21 league in this season, and scored 5 goals in the league for the team.

From the 2015/16 season Ludogorets got the chance to have a second team in the B Group and Denislav was promoted to the newly created Ludogorets Razgrad II. He made his debut for the team on 26 July 2015 in a match against Dunav Ruse.

On 23 September 2015 he played again for the Ludogorets first team in a match against Lokomotiv 1929 Mezdra for the Bulgarian Cup. The match was won by Ludogorets by 5:0. On 22 May 2015 he made his complete debut in the A Group for Ludogorets in a match against Beroe Stara Zagora.

Aleksandrov started the 2017-18 season in Ludogorets II playing in the first match of the season against Lokomotiv 1929 Sofia.

On 15 May 2018 he scored his debut goal for Ludogorets first team in a league match against Beroe Stara Zagora.

CSKA 1948
On 8 January 2019 Aleksandrov joined CSKA 1948.

International career
Aleksandrov received his first call up for the Bulgaria on 12 November for the UEFA Nations League matches against Finland on 15 November 2020 and Republic of Ireland on 18 November.

Statistics

Club

References

External links
 

1997 births
Living people
Bulgarian footballers
Bulgaria youth international footballers
Bulgaria under-21 international footballers
Bulgaria international footballers
First Professional Football League (Bulgaria) players
Second Professional Football League (Bulgaria) players
PFC Ludogorets Razgrad players
PFC Ludogorets Razgrad II players
FC CSKA 1948 Sofia players
Association football midfielders
Sportspeople from Pleven